Paul Maxwell was an actor.

Paul Maxwell may also refer to:

Paul Maxwell (murder victim)
Paul Maxwell, singer in The Tearjerkers
Paul Maxwell, character in An American Girl: Chrissa Stands Strong